Flash MP3 Player is a web application that allows users to create a music player on their website. It is based on Flash and PHP, but it can be installed without any programming skills. Users are simply required to embed a piece of HTML code into their website and application automatically generates a playlist by scanning a specified folder for MP3 files and using ID3 tags for naming. The looks of the application is customizable via XML file.

Features 
 Easy installation.
 Forms playlist automatically.
 Customizable design.
 Fully resizable.
 Autoplay and autoresume options.

See also
 Comparison of media players

External links
 Flash MP3 Player main site
 Flash MP3 Player demo
 Flash MP3 Player download

Web applications
Client/server media players
Adobe Flash
PHP software
Creative Commons-licensed works